McCandless is a township with home rule status in Allegheny County, Pennsylvania, United States. The population was 29,709 at the 2020 census. It is a northern suburb of the Pittsburgh metropolitan area.

McCandless is part of the North Allegheny School District and participates in the multi-municipality Northland Public Library. It has been ranked highly among Money Magazine's "Best Places to Live."

Though McCandless no longer operates under the First Class Township Code, it is classified as a first-class township for certain purposes. The inclusion of the word "Town" in its name sometimes causes confusion, since with one exception, a "town" is not a municipal unit in Pennsylvania.

History
Native American artifacts, primarily Iroquois Nation, have been found in areas of the township. Early written history includes a visit by George Washington and his guide, Christopher Gist, in 1753.

The state of Pennsylvania enacted legislation in order to gain Continental Script, a quickly depreciating currency during the Revolutionary War. The legislation ordered for a plan to sell Iroquois land that was known as the Depreciation Lands at the time; this land included the North Hills. Soldiers redeemed their certificates by receiving cash or Iroquois land. Because of this, Iroquois unrest emerged and did not stop until the Iroquois were defeated in 1794.

The first European settler in McCandless Township was James Duff, who had purchased  in 1796.  Farming increased in the area, and in 1849, meetings were held, presided over by Daniel Vogel, for the purpose of forming a local government. The township was founded in 1851 and called "Taylor Township". The area was incorporated in 1857 as a second class township and renamed "McCandless Township" in honor of District Judge Wilson McCandless. The published population was 1,482 persons.

During the 1800s McCandless Township was primarily a farming community. During the War of 1812, an important supply route for the transportation of war materials from Pittsburgh to Commodore Perry's forces on Lake Erie passed through the area.

In 1908 an interurban commuter railroad, the Harmony Line, allowed area residents to easily commute to Pittsburgh. A concurrent oil boom resulted in rapid early development, centered on the rail stations in the Highland and Ingomar areas.

By 1931, the Harmony Line was closed because of the popularity of the automobile.

Allegheny County Commissioner E. V. Babcock initiated the establishment of Allegheny County's North Park. He purchased the land and later sold it to the county at cost. North Park was founded in 1927 by Allegheny County. Approximately  of the park, are located in McCandless. This area represents approximately 15.2% of the town.

Between 1930 and 1950, the town more than doubled its population (from 2,653 to 6,488). By 1960, the population had redoubled (14,582) and has since doubled again. At the 2000 census, the number of households in the town was 11,159.

Expanding population and traffic brought more diversified development into the area. McKnight Road was built in the mid 1950s and became the primary access into the north suburban areas. Retail and office uses occupy some of the McCandless segment of the McKnight corridor. The Community College of Allegheny County opened a campus in the area in 1972. A new mixed-use development acting as a town center, McCandless Crossing, was completed in 2016 and serves as a strip mall as well as an apartment complex and a townhome neighborhood.

Geography

The municipality lies on the Allegheny Plateau and is characterized by generally hilly terrain.  A floodplain lies in the area of Pine Creek, which cuts a deep valley through the central portion of the township.

Surrounding neighborhoods
McCandless has four borders, including Pine Township to the north, Hampton Township to the east, Ross Township to the south and the borough of Franklin Park to the west.

Demographics

As of the census of 2000, there were 29,022 people, 11,159 households, and 7,922 families residing in the township.  The population density was 1,754.4 people per square mile (677.5/km2).  There were 11,697 housing units at an average density of 707.1 per square mile (273.0/km2).  The racial makeup of the township was 94.58% White, 1.29% African American, 0.05% Native American, 3.19% Asian, 0.01% Pacific Islander, 0.14% from other races, and 0.74% from two or more races. Hispanics or Latinos of any race were 0.70% of the population.

There were 11,159 households, out of which 32.2% had children under the age of 18 living with them, 62.8% were married couples living together, 6.1% had a female householder with no husband present, and 29.0% were non-families. 25.0% of all households were made up of individuals, and 8.9% had someone living alone who was 65 years of age or older.  The average household size was 2.49 and the average family size was 3.02.

In the township the population was spread out, with 23.6% under the age of 18, 6.8% from 18 to 24, 27.8% from 25 to 44, 25.8% from 45 to 64, and 16.1% who were 65 years of age or older.  The median age was 40 years. For every 100 females, there were 90.7 males.  For every 100 females age 18 and over, there were 86.9 males.

The median income for a household in the township was $62,159, and the median income for a family was $73,482. Males had a median income of $57,415 versus $33,319 for females. The per capita income for the township was $31,792.  About 2.2% of families and 4.0% of the population were below the poverty line, including 3.2% of those under age 18 and 9.1% of those age 65 or over.

Government and Politics

Town Council
[2017-2019] Democrats-3 (Zachary, Mertz, Schweiger), Mulitparty-2 (Walkauskas, McKim), Republicans-2 (Kirk, Powers)

Notable people

References

External links
 McCandless official website
 Pennsylvania Code, Title 302, Chapter 23 — the McCandless home rule charter

Home Rule Municipalities in Allegheny County, Pennsylvania
Pittsburgh metropolitan area
Townships in Allegheny County, Pennsylvania
Townships in Pennsylvania